Cotaparaco District is one of ten districts of the Recuay Province in Peru.

Geography 
Other mountains are listed below:

References

Districts of the Recuay Province
Districts of the Ancash Region